Adrian Bică Bădan (born 11 December 1988 in Constanţa) is a Romanian former footballer.

Career 
Bică Bădan played most of his career on loan by U.S. Vibonese Calcio, Cassino and Milazzo, from his club Catania Calcio. In January 2011 returned to his native Romania and signed for FC Viitorul Constanța. He played also sixteen months in his hometown for Viitorul, before returned to Italy to sign for Nissa F.C. A.S.D. After a year for Serie D club Nissa, who played during 30 games, joined to Eccellenza side Mazara Calcio A.S.D. Since Summer 2013 played for Serie D club A.S.D. Due Torri.

Notes

1988 births
Living people
Romanian footballers
U.S. Vibonese Calcio players
Romanian expatriate footballers
Expatriate footballers in Italy
A.S.D. Cassino Calcio 1924 players
Romanian expatriate sportspeople in Italy
S.S. Milazzo players
Association football defenders